Gyrodon miretipes is a bolete mushroom described in 1983 from Burundi. it has a red-brown cap and stipe, and yellow-tan decurrent gills.

References

External links
 

Fungi described in 1983
Paxillaceae
Fungi of Africa
Biota of Burundi